Daniel Morillo (born January 21, 1988 in Ibiza) is an athlete from Spain, who competes in archery.

2008 Summer Olympics
At the 2008 Summer Olympics in Beijing Morillo finished his ranking round with a total of 657 points, which gave him the 33rd seed for the final competition bracket in which he faced Markiyan Ivashko in the first round, in which he beat the archer from Ukraine 115-107. In the second round Morillo faced Juan René Serrano, the leader after the ranking round with 679 points. In a tight match Serrano was the winner with 112-111 and advanced to the next round.

References

1988 births
Living people
Spanish male archers
Archers at the 2008 Summer Olympics
Olympic archers of Spain
Sportspeople from Ibiza
21st-century Spanish people